Windsor round open was one of the first events to be held in archery. Both men and women competed in the event in 1960.

Men's Windsor round open

Women's Windsor round open 

Defunct events at the Summer Paralympics
Archery at the Summer Paralympics